Perepolsky is a rural locality (a khutor) in Tryasinovskoye Rural Settlement, Serafimovichsky District, Volgograd Oblast, Russia. The population was 18 as of 2010.

Geography 
Perepolsky is located 34 km northeast of Serafimovich (the district's administrative centre) by road. Gryazinovsky is the nearest rural locality.

References 

Rural localities in Serafimovichsky District